This is a list of members of the Victorian Legislative Council between the elections of 31 May 1922 and 4 June 1925. As half of the Legislative Council's terms expired at each triennial election, half of these members were elected at the 1922 triennial election with terms expiring in 1928, while the other half were elected at the 1919 triennial election with terms expiring in 1925.

The Electoral Provinces Boundaries Act 1903 defined 17 Provinces with two members each for a total of 34 members.

Note the "Term in Office" refers to that members term(s) in the Council, not necessarily for that Province.

Walter Manifold, then Sir Frank Clarke was President; William Edgar was Chairman of Committees.

 On 20 October 1922, William Kendell, MLC for North Eastern, died; replaced by Albert Zwar in November 1922.
 In January 1924, Walter Manifold, MLC for Western, resigned; replaced by Marcus Saltau in March 1924.

References

 Re-member (a database of all Victorian MPs since 1851). Parliament of Victoria.

Members of the Parliament of Victoria by term
20th-century Australian politicians